Tupy may refer to:
 Tupy, a cultivar of blackberry
 Tupy Futebol Clube, a Brazilian football club
 Esporte Clube Tupy, a Brazilian football club
 Daniel Tupý (1984-2005), a student from Slovakia, murder victim of a hate crime

See also
 Tupi (disambiguation)